Herman Guy Fisher (November 2, 1898 – September 26, 1975), was born in Unionville Pennsylvania. He is best known as the co-founder of the famous toy brand Fisher-Price.

Biography
Herman G. Fisher was born in Unionville, Pennsylvania in 1898. He graduated from the Pennsylvania State University where he was a member of Sigma Pi fraternity in 1921 with a BA in Commerce and Finance.

In 1930, he got together with Irving Price, Margaret Evans Price and Helen Schelle to establish a toy company under the name of Fisher-Price. Although this was the time of the Great Depression, the company manufactured 16 wooden toys which proved highly popular at the American International Toy Fair in New York City. Fisher was the president and chairman of the Fisher-Price company from its inception in 1930 to 1969 (he later retired and sold the firm to the Quaker Oats Company.) He was instrumental in building Fisher-Price into the world's largest manufacturer of preschool toys.

Along with Irving Price and Helen Schelle, he established the simple but strict Fisher-Price creed: "Fisher-Price toys should have intrinsic play value, ingenuity, strong construction, good value and action."

Herman Fisher was also instrumental in spearheading many 'firsts' in the toy industry. He coined the term “preschool toys” with the advent of the wooden blocks in 1934, the first to use plastic in 1950 in Queen Buzzy Bee’s wings and the creation of “National Baby Week” in the fifties.

Other information
The Fisher Plaza in the Penn State University is named after him. He donated a large amount of money "to provide an area of beauty for his alma mater where all could pause to rest, reflect, or just watch the flowers grow."
In 1985, he was inducted in the Toy Industry Association's Toy Industry Hall of Fame.
Was a member of Sigma Pi fraternity at Penn State.
In 1938, during his tenure as the president of TMA, he led the campaign to establish the association's statistical committee.
He has several great-grandchildren, including Jessica Fisher, who is currently in a custody battle for the company Fisher-Price.

References

Herman Guy Fisher Biography

American manufacturing businesspeople
1898 births
1975 deaths
Smeal College of Business alumni
Fisher-Price